The Ligue de la patrie française (French Homeland League) was a French nationalist and anti-Dreyfus organization. It was officially founded in 1899, and brought together leading right-wing artists, scientists and intellectuals. The league fielded candidates in the 1902 national elections, but was relatively unsuccessful. After this it gradually became dormant. Its bulletin ceased publication in 1909.

History

Origins

The League originated with three young academics, Louis Dausset, Gabriel Syveton and Henri Vaugeois, who wanted to show that Dreyfusism was not accepted by all at the University.
They were opposed to the League for the Rights of Man, and wanted to show that not all intellectuals supported the Left, and the cause of the homeland was as valid as the cause of Dreyfus and the lay Republic.
After an initial meeting on 25 October 1898 in Paris a section was quickly opened in Lille.
They launched a petition that attacked Zola and what many saw as an internationalist, pacifist left-wing conspiracy.
In November 1898 their petition gained signatures in the Parisian schools, and was soon circulated throughout political, intellectual and artistic circles in Paris.

Charles Maurras gained the interest of the writer Maurice Barrès, and the movement gained the support of three eminent personalities: the geographer Marcel Dubois, the poet François Coppée and the critic and literature professor Jules Lemaître.
Barres would provide the inspiration while Lemaitre looked after the organization.
Charles Daniélou had been present at the last meeting between Émile Zola and François Coppée during the Dreyfus affair.
Zola had decided to publish his J'accuse…!, in which he proclaimed that Dreyfus was innocent, despite pleas by Coppée. 
Daniélou sided with Coppée and helped found the League in December 1898.
The final decision to create the League was made on 31 December 1898.

Active period

The Ligue de la patrie française was established on 4 January 1899 with Jules Lemaître as its nominal leader.
Lemaître held the organizational meeting on 19 January 1899.
Maurice Barrès was in practice the intellectual leader.
The League was aligned with the Académie française, the army, the church, the aristocracy and the wealthy classes.
It brought together a large number of antidreyfusard intellectuals to show that the great names of letters and science did not support revision of the verdict of the Dreyfus trial. 
This conservative group had prestige comparable to that of the signatories of the Manifeste des intellectuels launched by Georges Clemenceau.
Many well-known members of the Académie signed on including Léon Daudet, Albert Sorel and Jules Verne.
The painters Edgar Degas and Pierre-Auguste Renoir supported the movement.
About 30,000 members joined in the first month.
Workers, artisans and employees represented at most 4% of the membership, while members of the literary, artistic, legal and medical professions made up almost 70%.

The League did not at first take an anti-Semitic position, although Lemaitre claimed at the January organizational meeting that for the past twenty years Jews, Protestants and Freemasons had conspired to run France.
The League refused to engage in a resolute defense of the church.
The League was interested in restoring order, but not in establishing an authoritarian regime.
Unlike the Ligue des Patriotes and other populist leagues, with Lemaître as president the Ligue de la patrie française rejected violence and avoided abusive language, and thus was more acceptable to the middle classes.

By February 1899 the league claimed 40,000 members.
However, despite being well-funded and represented throughout France the organization was weak.
The League was divided between Republican moderates like Ferdinand Brunetière who just wanted to end the disruption caused by the Dreyfus affair and anti-Semitic nationalists like Barrès who wanted an excuse to overthrow the Republic.
François Coppée had Bonapartist leanings and was in favor of a coup.
In 1899 Maurice Pujo and Henri Vaugeois left the League and established a new movement, Action Française, and a new journal, Revue de l'Action française.
Charles Maurras soon joined the Action Française, whose leaders criticized the timid nature of the League and its lack of clear objectives.
The Revue de l'Action française expressed more radical views, and was anti-Republican.
Maurras thought the Bourbon monarchy should be restored, using violence if needed.

The League had some success in the Paris municipal elections in 1900, but soon began to fall apart.
Antidreyfusism proved not to be a sufficiently strong cause to hold together members who had radically different opinions on other subjects.
The League's candidates in the 1902 legislative elections did poorly outside of Paris.
Most of the League's activists abandoned it in favor of Albert Gauthier de Clagny's Républicains plébiscitaires or Jules Méline's Fédération républicaine.
The League's treasurer Gabriel Syveton was elected deputy for the Seine in 1902. 
A meeting organized on 7 March 1903 in Lille by the League and the Ligue des Patriotes was able to draw 5,000 people including students, young Catholics, clerics and reactionary notables.
However, the movement went into rapid decline after being defeated in the 1904 municipal elections.

Later years

General  Louis André, the militantly anticlerical War Minister from 1900 to 1904, used reports by Freemasons to build a huge card index on public officials that detailed those who were Catholic and attended Mass, with a view to preventing their promotions.
In 1904, Jean Bidegain, assistant Secretary of Grand Orient de France, sold a selection of the files to Gabriel Syveton for 40,000 francs.
In November 1904 Syveton gained notoriety when he physically attacked General André in the Assembly in a debate over the files.
Syveton died on 9 December 1904 the day before he was due to appear before the Court of Assizes.
The nationalists claimed that he had not committed suicide but had been assassinated by the Masons.
The Affaire Des Fiches scandal led directly to the resignation of prime minister Émile Combes.

After Lemaitre left the League, Louis Dausset assumed the presidency. He in turn resigned in 1905.
The Bulletin officiel de la Ligue de la Patrie française appears to have ceased publication in 1909.

Executive

The executive of the league included:

François Coppée – Honorary President
Jules Lemaître –  President
Gabriel Syveton  – Treasurer
Louis Dausset – Secretary general 
Henri Vaugeois –  Assistant secretary
Alfred Mathieu Giard – Delegate 
François de Mahy – Delegate 
Maurice Barrès – Delegate 
Ferdinand Brunetière – Delegate 
Marcel Dubois – Delegate

Members

The first members of the league also included:

Juliette Adam
Paul Allard
Gaston Audiffret-Pasquier
Ernest Babelon
Charles Barbier de Meynard
Arvède Barine
Albert Bartholomé
Charles Costa de Beauregard
André Bellessort
Jean Béraud
Jacques-Émile Blanche
Marie-Louis-Antoine-Gaston Boissier
Robert de Bonnières
Henri de Bornier
Théodore Botrel
Paul Bourget
Joseph Valentin Boussinesq
Henri Boutet
Pierre de Bréville
Albert, 4th duc de Broglie
Charles Jules Edmée Brongniart
Caran d'Ache
Carolus-Duran
Albert Carré
Godefroy Cavaignac
Honoré Champion
Anatole Chauffard
Victor Cherbuliez
Arthur Chuquet
Édouard Collignon
Gustave-Claude-Etienne Courtois
Pascal Dagnan-Bouveret
Léon Daudet
Edgar Degas
Léon Deschamps
Édouard Detaille
Léon Dierx
Jules-Albert de Dion
René Doumic
Guillaume Dubufe
Pierre Duhem
Emmanuel des Essarts
Émile Faguet
Jean-Louis Forain
Paul Foucart
Henry Gauthier-Villars
Émile Gebhart
Jean-Léon Gérôme
Georges Goyau
Alfred Grandidier
Maurice Hauriou
José-Maria de Heredia
Charles Hermite
Henry Houssaye
Henri Huchard
Vincent d'Indy
Jean Antoine Injalbert
Ernest de Jonquières
Camille Jordan
Pierre Laffitte
Albert Auguste Cochon de Lapparent
Henri Lavedan
Henry Louis Le Châtelier
Jean-Jules-Antoine Lecomte du Nouÿ
Louis Léger
Ernest Legouvé
Émile Lemoine
Auguste Longnon
Pierre Louÿs
Frédéric Masson
Charles Maurras
Stanislas-Étienne Meunier
Alfred Mézières
Frédéric Mistral
Parfait-Louis Monteil
Georges Montorgueil
Adrien Albert Marie de Mun
Jacques Normand
Philbert Maurice d'Ocagne
Edmond Perrier
Louis Petit de Julleville
Émile Picard
Maurice Pujo
Jean-François Raffaëlli
Alfred Nicolas Rambaud
Onésime Reclus
Sibylle Riqueti de Mirabeau
Henri Rouart
Eugène Rouché
Edmond Rousse
René de Saint-Marceaux
Francisque Sarcey
Pierre de Ségur
Paul Armand Silvestre
Albert Sorel
André Theuriet
Georges Thiébaud
Paul Thureau-Dangin
Suzanne Valadon
Albert Vandal
Jules Verne
Melchior de Vogüé
Eugène-Melchior de Vogüé
Charles Wolf

Publications

Journals

 – archives

Miscellaneous

Notes

Sources

Dreyfus affair
Organizations established in 1899
Organizations disestablished in 1909
French Third Republic
Maurice Barrès